was the fourth of twenty-four s, built for the Imperial Japanese Navy (IJN) following World War I. When introduced into service, these ships were the most powerful destroyers in the world. They served as first-line destroyers through the 1930s, and remained formidable weapons systems well into the Pacific War.

History
Construction of the advanced Fubuki-class destroyers was authorized as part of the IJN's expansion program from fiscal 1923, intended to give Japan a qualitative edge with the world's most modern ships. The Fubuki class had performance that was a quantum leap over previous destroyer designs, so much so that they were designated . The large size, powerful engines, high speed, large radius of action and unprecedented armament gave these destroyers the firepower similar to many light cruisers in other navies. Miyuki, built at the Uraga Dock Company was laid down on 30 April 1927, launched on 29 June 1928 and commissioned on 29 June 1929. Originally assigned hull designation “Destroyer No. 38”, she was completed as Miyuki.

Operational history

Miyuki was lost in a collision with the Japanese destroyer  on 29 June 1934 in the Korea Strait, south of Cheju. The number of casualties is not certain, but at least five crewmen perished in the accident. Miyuki was struck from the navy list on 15 August 1934.

Miyuki was the only modern Japanese destroyer that did not serve in World War II, and was the only Japanese destroyer lost in a collision with another Japanese destroyer.

Notes

References
 

 

Fubuki-class destroyers
Ships built by Uraga Dock Company
1928 ships
Maritime incidents in 1934
Shipwrecks in the Korea Strait
Ships sunk in collisions